The Men's 50 metre freestyle S10 swimming event at the 2004 Summer Paralympics was competed from 26 to 24 September.Benoît Huot won the competition representing Canada with a world record time of 24.71 seconds.

1st round

Heat 1
26 Sept. 2004, morning session

Heat 2
26 Sept. 2004, morning session

Swim off

Final

References

M